Synstemon is a genus of flowering plants belonging to the family Brassicaceae.

Its native range is Northern China.

Species:

Synstemon lulianlianus 
Synstemon petrovii

References

Brassicaceae
Brassicaceae genera
Taxa named by Victor Botchantsev